CHMK-FM is a First Nations community radio station that operates at 93.1 FM in Manawan, Quebec, Canada.

The station originally began broadcasting in 1980 at 95.1 FM, until it received CRTC to move to its current frequency in 1991.

References

External links
CHMK 93,1 FM

Hmk